Safarabad (also Romanized as Safarābād) is a village in Kunani Rural District, Kunani District, Kuhdasht County, Lorestan Province, Iran. At the 2006 census, its population was 166, in 35 families.

References 

Towns and villages in Kuhdasht County